The Eternal Waltz is a 1954 West German drama film dramatizing the life of Johann Strauss II. The initial story was written by Hanns Marschall and Ruth Charlotte Silbermann, and the film itself was written by Alexander Lix; the adaptation was by Paul Verhoeven who also directed the film.

It was shot at the Bavaria Studios in Munich and on location in Vienna. The film's sets were designed by the art director Franz Bi and Bruno Monden.

Cast

References

Bibliography

External links

1954 films
West German films
1950s German-language films
1950s biographical films
German biographical films
Biographical films about musicians
Films about classical music and musicians
Films about composers
Films directed by Paul Verhoeven (Germany)
Films set in the 19th century
1950s historical films
German historical films
Films shot at Bavaria Studios
Films shot in Vienna
Cultural depictions of Johann Strauss II
1950s German films